In the qualifying event at the men's doubles competition at the 2015 Wimbledon tennis championships, four qualifying pairs and two "lucky loser" pairs were selected to proceed to the main event.

Seeds

Qualifiers

Lucky losers

Qualifying draw

First qualifier

Second qualifier

Third qualifier

Fourth qualifier

References
 Qualifying draw
2015 Wimbledon Championships – Men's draws and results at the International Tennis Federation

Men's Doubles Qualifying
Wimbledon Championship by year – Men's doubles qualifying